Meconopsis is a genus of flowering plants in the poppy family Papaveraceae. It was created by French botanist Viguier in 1814 for the species known by the common name Welsh poppy, which Carl Linnaeus had described as Papaver cambricum. The genus name means "poppy-like" (from Greek mekon poppy, opsis alike). Himalayan species discovered later were also placed in Meconopsis. In the 21st century, it was discovered that the Himalayan species were less closely related to the Welsh poppy, which has been restored to Papaver. All species now placed in Meconopsis are native to the Himalayas and surrounding regions. They have attractive, usually blue flowers.

The taxonomy of Meconopsis remains unsettled. Although many sources recognize the genus, others sink it into Papaver. There is also uncertainty over the number of species, as many readily hybridise with each other producing viable seed. It is likely that some individually named species are in fact a single species but with an under-appreciated morphological diversity.

A large proportion of species are monocarpic and as such are notoriously difficult to maintain in cultivation.

Meconopsis species do not produce opium.

Taxonomy
The genus Meconopsis and its species have a complex taxonomic history. A European species was first described in 1753 by Carl Linnaeus as Papaver cambricum, commonly known as the Welsh poppy. It has a  style, while all other then described Papaver species lacked one, having only a "stigmatic disc" (i.e. a disc-shaped region on the top of the ovary receptive to pollen). On the basis of this difference, in 1814, Louis Viguier transferred P. cambricum to his new genus Meconopsis as Meconopsis cambrica, then the only species. Later, when mainly blue-flowered poppy-like species with styles like the Welsh poppy were discovered in the Himalayas and neighbouring regions, they were also placed in the genus Meconopsis. However, molecular phylogenetic studies from 1995 onwards showed that the Welsh poppy was not closely related to the Himalayan species, but rather to Papaver species. In 2011, Kadereit et al. proposed that Linnaeus's original name should be restored. However, as Meconopsis cambrica was the type species of the genus Meconopsis, if the Welsh poppy was moved back to Papaver, all the Himalayan species would have to be placed in this genus as well. In 2012, it was proposed that Meconopsis should become a conserved name, with the new type Meconopsis regia. This proposal has been accepted.

Phylogeny
Molecular phylogenetic studies have shown that the Old World members of the subfamily Papaveroideae form a monophyletic clade. However, they have sometimes left relationships within this clade unresolved. A 2014 study found that neither Meconopsis nor Papaver were monophyletic. Meconopsis was split into two clades, a large one which the authors called section Eumeconopsis, and a smaller one, Meconopsis sect. Eucathcartia, containing four of the species included in the study.

An alternative cladogram resolves Clade III as the sister of Clades I and II. It was suggested that the generic name Meconopsis should be retained for Clade I, and Clade V should be treated as the genus  Cathcartia. This would still leave Papaver non-monophyletic. An alternative approach, adopted by Plants of the World Online and since largely reversed, was to sink Meconopsis, Roemeria, Stylomecon and Cathcartia into Papaver.

Sections
In 2017, Xiao and Simpson raised Meconopsis sect. Eucathcartia (Clade V) to the genus Cathcartia. On the basis of a further molecular phylogenetic study they divided Meconopsis into four sections.
Meconopsis sect. Meconopsis

Meconopsis autumnalis P.A.Egan
Meconopsis chankheliensis Grey-Wilson
Meconopsis dhwojii G.Taylor
Meconopsis discigera Prain
Meconopsis ganeshensis Grey-Wilson
Meconopsis gracilipes G.Taylor
Meconopsis manasluensis P A.Egan
Meconopsis napaulensis DC.
Meconopsis paniculata Prain
Meconopsis pinnatifolia C.Y.Wu & H.Chuang ex L.H.Zhou
Meconopsis regia G.Taylor
Meconopsis robusta Hook.f. & Thomson
Meconopsis simikotensis Grey-Wilson
Meconopsis staintonii Grey-Wilson
Meconopsis superba King ex Prain
Meconopsis taylorii L.H.J.Williams
Meconopsis tibetica Grey-Wilson
Meconopsis torquata Prain
Meconopsis violacea Kingdon-Ward
Meconopsis wallichii Hook.
Meconopsis wilsonii Grey-Wilson

Meconopsis sect. Aculeatae Fedde

Meconopsis aculeata Royle
Meconopsis bikramii Aswal (doubtfully placed here)
Meconopsis concinna Prain
Meconopsis delavayi Franch. Ex Prain
Meconopsis forrestii Prain
Meconopsis georgei G.Taylor
Meconopsis henrici Bureau & Franch.
Meconopsis horridula Hook.f. & Thomson
Meconopsis impedita Prain
Meconopsis lancifolia Franch.
Meconopsis latifolia Prain
Meconopsis muscicola Tosh.Yoshida, H.Sun & Boufford
Meconopsis neglecta G.Taylor
Meconopsis pseudovenusta G.Taylor
Meconopsis pulchela Tosh.Yoshida, H.Sun & Bouford
Meconopsis venusta Prain
Meconopsis yaoshanensis Tosh.Yoshida, H.Sun & Boufford

Meconopsis sect. Primulinae Fedde

Meconopsis argemonantha Prain
Meconopsis bella Prain
Meconopsis florindae Kingdon-Ward
Meconopsis lyrata (H.A.Cummins & Prain) Fedde
Meconopsis primulina Prain
Meconopsis sinuata Prain
Meconopsis wumungensis K.M.Feng
Meconopsis zang-nanensis L.H.Zhou

Meconopsis sect. Grandes Fedde

Meconopsis betonicifolia Franch.
Meconopsis biloba L.Z.An, Shu Y.Chen & Y.S.Lian
Meconopsis grandis Prain
Meconopsis integrifolia (Maxim.) Franch.
Meconopsis punicea Maxim.
Meconopsis quintuplinervia Regel
Meconopsis simplicifolia (D.Don) Walp.
Meconopsis sherriffii G.Taylor

A further species was described after Xiao and Simpson's classification:
Meconopsis gakyidiana Tosh.Yoshida, Yangzom & D.G.Long

Xiao and Simpson placed four former Meconopsis species in the genus Cathcartia:
Cathcartia chelidonifolia (Bureau & Franch.) Grey-Wilson = Meconopsis chelidoniifolia Bureau & Franch.
Cathcartia oliveriana (Franch. ex Prain) Grey-Wilson = Meconopsis oliveriana Franch. ex Prain
Cathcartia smithiana Hand.-Mazz. = Meconopsis smithiana (Hand.-Mazz.) G.Taylor ex Hand.-Mazz.
Cathcartia villosa Hook.f. = Meconopsis villosa (Hook.f.) G.Taylor

Cultivation
Himalayan varieties have the reputation for being difficult to grow from seed, but when germinating new plants, using fresh seeds will help. These plants  are available in a variety of strong colours, including blue, red, orange, purple, white and yellow depending on species and cultivar.

All meconopsis require an acid or neutral soil pH, in a partially shaded sheltered position.

Cultivars
The following cultivars, of mixed or uncertain heritage, have won the Royal Horticultural Society's Award of Garden Merit:-
 
 'Bobby Masterton' (Infertile Blue Group) 
 'Dalemain' (George Sherriff Group) 
 'Keillour' 
'Marit' 
 'Mop-Head' (Fertile Blue Group) 
'Mrs Jebb' (Infertile Blue Group) 
'P.C. Abildgaard' (Infertile Blue Group)
 'Slieve Donard' (Infertile Blue Group) 
 'Susan's Reward' (George Sherriff Group)

Pests and diseases

In the United Kingdom, Meconopsis has been affected by the invasive golden root mealybug. Damping off may occur on seedling grown plants.

References

External links

Meconopsis.org specialized website - includes further links
 A Meconopsis visual reference guide

 
Papaveraceae genera